Maracaibo is a 1958 American drama film directed by Cornel Wilde and written by Ted Sherdeman. The film stars Cornel Wilde, Jean Wallace, Abbe Lane, Francis Lederer, Michael Landon and Joe E. Ross. The film was released on May 21, 1958, by Paramount Pictures.

Plot

Red Adair–type former Navy Frogman Vic Scott is on vacation in Venezuela when a huge oil fire at a well of his rich friend erupts. While romancing a newly-famous novelist from New York a colleague locates him and persuades him to help put out the blaze, just as theirs is starting.

More romance than adventure for the first two-thirds of the film, Maracaibo ultimately settles down to dramatic scenes of underwater work to extinguish the fire before a huge storm arrives. The action is interrupted from time to time to explore the romantic angle, including scenes between Abbe Lane's character and Cornel Wilde's, who were lovers only a few years prior—though she is now engaged to the rich oil baron.

Will her past be revealed? Will the New York author get her man? Will Vic Scott put out the fire near Maracaibo before it reaches the city, then finally settle down?

Cast 
 Cornel Wilde as Vic Scott
 Jean Wallace as Laura Kingsley
 Abbe Lane as Elena Holbrook
 Francis Lederer as Miguel Orlando
 Michael Landon as Lago Orlando
 Joe E. Ross as Milt Karger
 Jack Kosslyn as Raoul Palma
 Lillian Buyeff as Mrs. Felicia Montera
 George Ramsey as Mr. Ricardo Montera
 Martín Vargas as Flamenco Dancer
 Maruja as Cabaret Dancer
 Carmen D'Antonio as Cabaret Dancer

Production
The film was based on a novel by Stirling Silliphant which he had written in Cuba. Film rights were bought by Universal who intended to turn it into a vehicle for Rock Hudson and Jane Wyman and Ted Shereman wrote a script. In
Cornel Wilde spotted Michael Landon on television and signed him to a three-picture contract. In September 1957 the rights went to Paramount, who gave it to Cornel Wilde's company, Theodora. Wilde would produce, direct and star.

Silliphant later called it "a perfectly dreadful, stinking film... with a screenplay that must have been written in the men's room of the Hollywood Knickerbocker."

References

External links 
 

1958 films
Paramount Pictures films
American drama films
1958 drama films
Films based on American novels
Films directed by Cornel Wilde
Films with screenplays by Stirling Silliphant
Films set in Venezuela
Films about firefighting
Works about petroleum
1950s English-language films
1950s American films